The ATH Network is an interbank network connecting the ATMs of various financial institutions in Puerto Rico and the Caribbean. ATH also serves as a debit card network for ATH-linked ATM cards. ATH currently has an agreement with the NYCE network to accept NYCE cards in Puerto Rico's ATH network and for Puerto Rico-based ATH cards to be accepted anywhere NYCE is accepted.

ATH is based in San Juan, Puerto Rico and is owned and operated by Evertec Group, LLC.
While not official, it stands for 'A Toda Hora', Spanish for 'At All Times'.

See also
ATM usage fees

External links
 ATH ATM network

Interbank networks
Financial services companies of Puerto Rico
Companies based in San Juan, Puerto Rico